Henri-Paul Motte (13 December 1846 – 1 April 1922) was a French painter from Paris, who specialised in history painting and historical genre.

Motte was a pupil of Jean-Léon Gérôme and began to exhibit at the Paris Salon from 1874 onwards. The painting Le cheval de Troie (The Trojan horse) was the artist's début at the Salon, and was acquired by the Wadsworth Atheneum in 2011. In 1892 he was made a Chevalier de la Légion d'honneur. He won a bronze medal at the Exposition Universelle (1900). He is best known for his work of the Siege of La Rochelle, a depiction of Cardinal Richelieu in battle in the 17th century, completed in 1881.

Works
Le cheval de Troie (The Trojan horse) (1874; Wadsworth Atheneum, Hartford, Connecticut)
Baal Moloch dévorant les prisonniers de guerre à Babylone (Baal Moloch devouring the prisoners of war in Babylon) (1876; National Museum of Fine Arts of Algiers)
Passage du Rhône par l'armée d'Annibal (Hannibal's army crossing the Rhône) (1878)
Circé et les compagnons d'Ulysse (Circe and the companions of Ulysses) (1879)
César s'ennuie (1880)
Richelieu sur la digue de La Rochelle (Richelieu on the sea wall of La Rochelle ) (1881; Musée des Beaux-Arts de La Rochelle)
[[The Fiancee of Belus|La fiancée de Bélus (The Fiancee of Belus)]] (1885)Vercingétorix se rend à César (Vercingetorix surrenders to Caesar) (1886)Les oies du Capitole (The geese of the Capitol) (1889)Napoléon au trône de Charlemagne (Napoleon at Charlemagne's Throne)'' (1898)

Gallery

References

External links

1846 births
1922 deaths
Painters from Paris
19th-century French painters
French male painters
20th-century French painters
20th-century French male artists
Chevaliers of the Légion d'honneur
19th-century French male artists